XHAWD-FM is a radio station located in the city of San Luis Potosí, San Luis Potosí, Mexico. Owned by the Fundación Nikola Tesla, A.C., a business of San Luis Potosí-based Grupo AWD, XHAWD-FM broadcasts on 101.3 FM and is known as Magnética FM.

History
XHAWD came to air on March 12, 2005 and is one of several ventures of Grupo AWD, a scientific company that also produces audio processors and cathodic protection systems.

The station is to move to 101.3 MHz on May 14, 2022.

References

Radio stations established in 2005
Radio stations in San Luis Potosí
Mass media in San Luis Potosí City